Saint Febronia may refer to :

 Saint Febronia of Nisibis, was a nun at Nisibis, Assyria.

 Saint Febronia of Syria, was a nun and Virgin-Martyr saint.

Saint Febronia